Hector Aldana (born August 17, 1988) is a Mexican mixed martial artist who competed in the Welterweight division of the Ultimate Fighting Championship (UFC).

Mixed martial arts career

Early career

Aldana compiled a professional mixed martial arts record of 4-0 by fighting solely within the Mexicali regional MMA circuit before signing for UFC in June 2018.

The Ultimate Fighter
Aldana was selected as one of the cast members for The Ultimate Fighter: Latin America 2 , UFC The Ultimate Fighter TV series, under Team Efrain Escudero in April 2015.

In the elimination round, Aldana won the fight against Álvaro Herrera by unanimous decision.

In the semi-finals, Aldana lost the fight to Enrique Marín via submission with a rear-naked choke in the first round.

Ultimate Fighting Championship
Aldana made his UFC debut against Kenan Song on June 23, 2018 at UFC Fight Night: Cowboy vs. Edwards. He lost the fight via TKO in the second round.

Aldana then faced Laureano Staropoli on November 17, 2018 at UFC Fight Night: Magny vs. Ponzinibbio. He lost the fight via unanimous decision. This fight earned him the Fight of the Night bonus award. 

Aldana then faced Miguel Baeza on October 12, 2019 at UFC Fight Night: Joanna vs. Waterson. He lost the fight via TKO in the first round.

Aldana was released by the UFC in February 2020.

Championships and accomplishments
Ultimate Fighting Championship
Fight of the Night (One Time)

Mixed martial arts record

|-
|Loss
|align=center|4–3
|Miguel Baeza
|TKO (leg kick and elbows)
|UFC Fight Night: Joanna vs. Waterson
|
|align=center|2
|align=center|2:32
|Tampa, Florida, United States
|
|-
|Loss
|align=center|4–2
|Laureano Staropoli
|Decision (unanimous)
|UFC Fight Night: Magny vs. Ponzinibbio
|
|align=center|3
|align=center|5:00
|Buenos Aires, Argentina
|
|-
|Loss
|align=center|4–1
|Song Kenan
|TKO (punches)
|UFC Fight Night: Cowboy vs. Edwards
|
|align=center|2
|align=center|4:42
|Kallang, Singapore
|
|-
|Win
|align=center|4–0
|Ivest Samayoa
|TKO (punches)
|Fights Factory – Sabori vs. Enriquez
|
|align=center|3
|align=center|1:30
|Mexicali, Baja California, Mexico
|
|-
|Win
|align=center|3–0
|Ivan Castillo
|TKO (punches)
|CG – Cage Gladiator 8
|
|align=center|1
|align=center|3:49
|Mexicali, Baja California, Mexico
|
|-
|Win
|align=center|2–0
|Cesar Carrasco
|Decision (unanimous)
|LAW 5 - Payback
|
|align=center|3
|align=center|5:00
|Mexicali, Baja California, Mexico
|
|-
|Win
|align=center|1–0
|Jorge Arturo Salazar
|Submission (rear-naked choke)
|LAW 1 - Heatwave
|
|align=center|1
|align=center|1:37
|Mexicali, Baja California, Mexico
|
|-

Mixed martial arts exhibition record

| Loss
|align=center| 1–1
| Enrique Marín
| Submission (rear-naked choke)
| The Ultimate Fighter: Latin America 2
| 
| align=center| 1
| align=center| 1:02
| Las Vegas, Nevada, United States
| Semifinal round.
|-
| Win
|align=center| 1–0
| Álvaro Herrera
| Decision (unanimous)
| The Ultimate Fighter: Latin America 2
| 
|align=center| 2
| align=center| 5:00
| Las Vegas, Nevada, United States
| Elimination Round.

See also 
 List of male mixed martial artists

References

External links 

 
 

1988 births
Living people
Welterweight mixed martial artists
Mexican male mixed martial artists
Sportspeople from Baja California
Ultimate Fighting Championship male fighters